James Douglas, 2nd Marquess of Douglas (c.1646 – 25 February 1700) was the son of Archibald Douglas, Earl of Angus and 1st Earl of Ormond, and Lady Anne Stuart.

James, second Marquis of Douglas, born in 1646, succeeded his grandfather in 1660, and was a privy councillor to Kings Charles II and James VII. He died 25 February 1700, in the 54th year of his age. His eldest son, James, Earl of Angus, born in 1671, in 1689 raised for the service of the nation, in one day, a regiment of eighteen hundred men, now called the 26th foot or Cameronians, of which he was appointed colonel, 19 April of that year. After much active service he fell at the Battle of Steinkirk 3d August 1692, in the 21st year of his age, unmarried. His half brother, William, also bore the title of earl of Angus, but died an infant in 1694. Archibald, the third son of the second marquis, succeeded as third marquis.

His first marriage was in 1670 to the Lady Barbara Erskine, daughter of John Erskine, 21st Earl of Mar and Jean Mackenzie.  He later married Mary Kerr, daughter of Robert Kerr, 1st Marquess of Lothian and Lady Jean Campbell.

The story of the end of the marriage between James Douglas and Barbara Erskine is immortalized in the popular ballad Waly Waly, which is known by many alternative titles (e.g. Jamie Douglas, When Cockleshells Turn Silver Bells, Water Is Wide) with many alternative lyrics and melodies.  If the lyrics are to be believed, in 1681 a rumour apparently was put to Douglas by Lowrie of Blackwood that Erskine had been sleeping with another man, and Douglas promptly dropped her.  Her father took her home and she never remarried.

References

1646 births
1700 deaths
James Douglas, 2nd Marquess of Douglas
Members of the Convention of the Estates of Scotland 1689
02